The Hefei–Anqing Expressway, commonly referred to as the He'an Expressway is an expressway that connects Hefei, Anhui, China and Anqing, Anhui. It is a spur of G42 Shanghai–Chengdu Expressway and is completely in Anhui Province.

References

Chinese national-level expressways
Expressways in Anhui